Lydia Akanvariba Lamisi is a Ghanaian nurse, a politician and a member of parliament for the Tempane Constituency. She contested in the 2020 Ghanaian General Election at her constituency Constituency and won the parliamentary seat.

Early life and education 
She was born on 7 October 1973.She was born at Tempane and she is a Christian. She studied Nursing and has LLB (Law).

Politics 
Lamisi is a member of the National Democratic Congress ( NDC). Her late husband, David Adakudugu was the Member of parliament for Tempane Constituency. After the death of her husband while serving in office, she decided to replace him as the Member of parliament for the same constituency. In December 2020, she was elected member of Parliament for the Tempane Constituency after she competed in the 2020 Ghanaian General Election under the ticket of the National Democratic Congress. She polled 20,939 votes which represents 56.0% of the total votes cast. She was elected over Joseph Dindiok Kpemka of the New Patriotic Party who also polled 16,462 votes which translates to 44.0% of total valid votes cast.

Personal life 
She is the wife of the late David Adakudugu.

References 

Living people
21st-century Ghanaian women politicians
National Democratic Congress (Ghana) politicians
Women members of the Parliament of Ghana
Ghanaian MPs 2021–2025
Year of birth missing (living people)